Salvino Salvini (March 26, 1824 – 1899 in Arezzo) was an Italian sculptor.

A different Salvino Salvini (1668 in Florence – 1751 in Florence) was an erudite bibliophile and writer.

Biography
He was born in Livorno, and studied at the Academy of Fine Arts of Florence under Luigi Bartolini, then moved to Rome where he continued studies at the Accademia Fiorentina in that city, studying under  Pietro Tenerani. His graduation essay was a statue of Archimedes. In 1852, he displayed a statue of Ehma, the desolate daughter of Sion. The statue of a woman yearning for her homeland would have had patriotic connotations for Italians.

In 1862, he was named professor in the Royal Academy of Bologna, and sculpted for the Camposanto of Pisa a statue of Nicola Pisano, and soon after he won a contest to design the equestrian statue of Vittorio Emanuele in the Piazza dell'Indipendenza in Florence. He exhibited at the 1877 Neapolitan National Exhibition of Fine Arts a marble statue of a Young Giotto and another marble bust of Gioachino Rossini; these works were also exhibited at Florence, in Rome, Bologna and Turin, where in 1884, he exhibited a bust in stucco depicting: Padre Cristoforo, also exhibited in Rome in 1883. He sculpted the statue of Cardinal Valeriani blessing the foundations of Santa Reparata found on the facade of the Duomo of Florence. He also made a monument to Guido Monaco for Arezzo.

The contemporary critic Tullo Massarani in his work L' arte a Paris praised Salvini's statue of Giotto, as an image of Italian genius. The poet Giuseppe Regaldi wrote a poem in praise, that as Giotto had been the start of Italian Renaissance, so Salvini was a sign of the renewed vigor of contemporary sculpture. He taught sculpture in Pisa and Bologna.

References

1824 births
1899 deaths
People from Livorno
Academic staff of the Accademia di Belle Arti di Bologna
19th-century Italian sculptors
Italian male sculptors
Accademia di Belle Arti di Firenze alumni
19th-century Italian male artists